The Barney family are important American financiers, equally famous for their pervasion in the society pages as they are for economic journals.  For the last 300 years the Barney clan has been lauded for their patronage of the arts and philanthropic pursuits.  From Barney's Department Store to the SmithBarney brokerage house. Their name and descendants have long been associated with style and high class.  To this day the Barneys are a notable family in high society and the American social register.

Barney is derived from old English and the family traces their lineage back to England where they prospered as merchants and investors in the East India Trading Company under colonial England.

Their earliest American ancestors sailed over with the pilgrims and the signature of their ancestors, the Tillys, is found on the Mayflower Compact.  During the 17th, 18th, 19th and 20th centuries the Barney line has produced numerous generals, titans of industry and influential politicians.

The Barney family genealogy has been extensively researched. One of the leading genealogists is William C. Barney, founder and President of the Barney Family Historical Association in Springfield, Virginia. William C. Barney has been researching the Barney family for more than 40 years, and has traveled to libraries throughout the United States and England to conduct genealogical research. He co-authored, with Eugene D. Preston, a book entitled 'The History of the Barney Family in America'.

The Barneys gained considerable power in government and business after the American revolution.  was named in their honor and Joshua Barney raised the flag at Fort McHenry, which inspired Francis Scott Key to write "The Star-Spangled Banner."

The family created a tremendous fortune through banking, investments, brokerage, real estate and marriage during the Gilded Age.  The 20th century marriage of William Barney, a descendant of Charles D. Barney, to Laura Jane Belmont, notable bankers with close ties to the Vanderbilts, marked the merging of two of America's most influential financial families.

Today the Barney name remains powerful in business largely due to their ancestor Charles D. Barney who is a founder of Smith Barney which today, under Citigroup is the largest firm of its kind.

Notable members 

Charles D. Barney,
Charles T. Barney,
Laura Jane Barney,
Joshua Barney,
William Barney,
John Barney

Banking families